Two Scrambled is a 1918 American short comedy film featuring Harold Lloyd. The film is presumed to be lost. Like many American films of the time, Two Scrambled was subject to restrictions and cuts by city and state film censorship boards. For example, the Chicago Board of Censors required a cut of the intertitle "The honest tailor will return the wallet, but it is killing him by inches."

Cast
 Harold Lloyd 
 Snub Pollard 
 Bebe Daniels 
 William Gillespie
 Helen Gilmore
 Bud Jamison
 James Parrott
 Malcolm St. Clair
 Charles Stevenson
 Noah Young

See also
 Harold Lloyd filmography

References

External links

1918 films
1918 comedy films
1918 short films
American silent short films
American black-and-white films
Films directed by Gilbert Pratt
Silent American comedy films
Lost American films
American comedy short films
1918 lost films
Lost comedy films
Censored films
1910s American films
1910s English-language films